T-Mobile Polska S.A. is a Polish mobile phone network operator. The company was formerly named Polska Telefonia Cyfrowa (lit. "Polish Digital Telephony") and operated under the name Era, until being rebranded as T-Mobile on 5 June 2011. As in other European countries, the company operates a GSM network. Following a decade-long ownership dispute with the French Vivendi corporation, the company has been wholly owned by the German telecommunications provider Deutsche Telekom since 2010.

History
Polska Telefonia Cyfrowa was founded as a company in December 1995, and on 26 February 1996 it won a license to provide telecommunications services paging number 602 and permission to build a mobile radio communication network according to the GSM standard in the 900 MHz band, which was later extended to GSM 1800 MHz. The first test (non-commercial) base stations were launched during the International Trade Fair in June 1996 and a few base stations in Warsaw. The commercial launch of the network took place on 16 September 1996.

At the end of 2004, Era had over 8.6 million customers and was the largest mobile phone network operator in Central Europe, and by the end of June 2011 it had 13.2 million subscribers, placing it third in the market with 30% market share. Era was one of Poland's most recognizable domestic brand names, partly because the company pursued an aggressive advertising campaign that made Era billboards, sponsored events, and other commercials ubiquitous in Poland. Towards the end of 2005, Era became the first mobile phone operator in Poland (and eighth in Europe) to have 10 million customers. The 10,000,000th client signing was celebrated with a concert by Van Morrison in Warsaw. Era was the first operator in the country to launch a HSDPA service in October 2006.

Services

Tak Tak
The company's prepaid mobile phone service was formerly called Tak Tak (Yes Yes), and is now called T-Mobile na kartę.

Heyah

Heyah is a pay-as-you-go flanker brand offered by Polish GSM provider Polska Telefonia Cyfrowa. The brand was introduced in 2004 as Polska Telefonia Cyfrowa's youth-focused offering but made no reference to either T-Mobile or Era in its branding. Although it is marketed primarily toward young people, it had a substantial effect on the Polish mobile telephony market with its significantly lower prices and one-second billing. Within a month of launch it had attracted over one million users.

Around 2022, Heyah shifted its target market to the Ukrainian minority in Poland.

tuBiedronka
tuBiedronka is a prepaid mobile phone brand offering by T-Mobile Polska in co-operation with the Polish discount supermarket chain Biedronka. The service was launched on 19 January 2009.

My Wallet
In October 2012, the company launched a commercial NFC wallet service in Poland called "MyWallet". The MyWallet services include NFC payment of two Mastercard credit cards and one MIFARE transit fare-collection card.

Marketing
Era signed a two-year sponsorship deal with Polish Basketball League in seasons 2003–2005 as Era Basket Liga.

T-Mobile signed a two-year sponsorship deal in June 2011 with the Ekstraklasa football league, the top-level league in Polish football. Its official name at the time was T-Mobile Ekstraklasa. The company has proposed to promote the use of new technologies within the game, as well as offering Polish football fans a series of promotional deals. In 2017, the league has been renamed to Lotto Ekstraklasa for sponsorship purposes, with the deal reported to be worth US$7.2 million annually.

In January 2013, T-Mobile Polska started a marketing campaign involving the figure of Vladimir Lenin who was the leader of Soviet Russia during the Polish–Soviet War (1919–1920). The campaign was intended to promote the brand of Heyah. The TV and billboard advertisements resulted in a debate on business ethics. The campaign has been viewed as unethical. There has even been some suspicion of the company utilising another controversial figure – Adolf Hitler – in a future campaign. Finally, under the pressure of public opinion and a protest action Heyah Hitler, the campaign was aborted.

See also
List of mobile network operators of Europe#Poland

References

External links
 Official website
 Corporate website
 Heyah official website
 Analysis of the effects of Heyah on the Polish market
 Increasing the competition in Polish mobile telecommunication market

Poland
Mobile phone companies of Poland
Polish subsidiaries of foreign companies
Companies based in Warsaw
Telecommunications companies established in 1995
1995 establishments in Poland